Balingasag, officially the Municipality of Balingasag, is a 2nd class municipality in the province of Misamis Oriental, Philippines. According to the 2020 census, it has a population of 74,385 people.

The town is being pushed to be included in the UNESCO World Heritage List due to its impressive array of colonial structures with hints of indigenous Mindanaoan architecture.

History

Balingasag started as a pre-Hispanic settlement, which was eventually discovered by the Spaniards when they came to colonize the Philippines. Presumably, the name came from two contracted Cebuano words "baling", which means fishing net, and "kasag", crab.

Legend has it that one day during the Spanish regime a group of guardia civil, while patrolling the seashore near the settlement of the natives, chanced upon some fishermen pulling fishing nets. A guardia civil asked a fisherman for the name of the place. Not understanding the language and thinking that he was asked what he what was doing, the fisherman, pointing his finger to the net, answered “baling”, and then turning it to the contents of the boat nearby, added “kasag”.

According to early accounts, the present town site of Balingasag was heavily forested, making it the favorite hiding place of bandits and pirates, who constantly terrorized the inhabitants. One of the notorious groups marauding the area was that of Datu Gumpot, who made the area now occupied by Cala-cala, a sitio of Barangay Cogon, as his base. This place was then known as Gumpot Kitagtag. The presence of these lawless elements in the area made the inhabitants evacuate to safer places every now and then.

Gumpot's group later on disappeared and never came back. This motivated the natives to settle. One group, however, moved to Galas, a part of the place known as Sabangan, an area somewhere between what is now Barangay Waterfall and Barangay Baliwagan. The other group remained at Gumpot Kitagtag.

Galas was ruled by Datu Marcos and his wife, Ba’ai Gregoria. On the other hand, Gumpot Kitagtag was under Datu Mateo and his wife Ba’ai Tomasa. Though these rulers now had their own territory, they remained true and loyal to each other. Marriages between the members of these two tribes further strengthened the bond that had since bound the two leaders. Notable of these conjugal unions was that of Marcos Antonio, the son of Datu Marcos, and Rita Gregoria, the daughter of Datu Mateo.

Eventually, these two great leaders died and were succeeded by their sons. Marcos Antonio became the Datu of Galas and Manuel Mateo ruled Gumpot Kitagtag. These new leaders maintained the alliance established by their predecessors. They constantly communicated with each other and discussed means, or undertook activities, to improve their settlements.

In one of their meetings, the idea of establishing a common place, where the members of their tribes could meet and conduct commercial or social activities, was developed. The two rulers, together with their respective followers, presented their choices. Finally, they decided to locate their meeting place or “poblacion” diha tungod nianang balinganan ta sa kasag (in the place where we catch crabs). This place was part of Galas.

The “poblacion” grew and became popular. In 1749, the Spanish Authority recognized the place and the whole territory of Sabangan under the name Balingasag. Thus, Sabangan could be considered as the old Balingasag.

In 1790, a great flood swept Sabangan, leaving the inhabitants nothing but desolation and depression. After the flood, the leader of Galas this time, Datu Antonio Ramon, the son of Datu Marcos Antonio, proposed to his followers the notion of transferring their settlement to a safer place. The inhabitants loved their place so much that they disagreed with the idea of their chieftain. In the end, however, the leader prevailed upon the followers.

Datu Antonio Ramon and his followers eyed Gumpot Kitagtag, now under the control of Datu Mamerto Manuel, the son and successor of Datu Manuel Mateo, as the ideal place to relocate. Negotiations ensued. After the conditions were agreed by both parties, the transfer began sometime in 1793 and was completed in 1810.

One of the important agreements between the two groups was to divide the poblacion into two. The present Rizal Street, then called Calle Real, which now traverses the span between the gate of Balingasag Central School and the town's wharf, became the demarcation line. All lots on the right side of this street, when facing mountain, and all agricultural lands as far as Baliwagan, would belong to Datu Antonio Ramon and his followers. To Datu Mamerto Manuel and his followers went all the lots on the opposite side of the poblacion and all the agricultural lands as far as Mandangoa. Governor General Narciso Claveria issued on 21 November 1841 a decree (Renovacion de Apellidos) requiring the natives to change their family names and if they had none, they have to adopt a new one. Consequently, Datu Mamerto Manuel chose “Valmores” as his surname, while Datu Antonio Ramon opted for “Madroño”.

Balingasag, being the name recognized by the Spanish Authority, gradually replaced the name of the territory that was Gumpot Kitagtag. In 1842, Balingasag was finally given official recognition as a town through a Spanish Royal Decree. If this royal decree were the basis of the existence of the present Balingasag, Mamerto Manuel Valmores and Antonio Ramon Madroño would then be considered as the “Founding Patriarchs” of this municipality.

The royal recognition of Balingasag as a political or administrative entity under the Spanish sovereignty engendered new systems and structures of governance, which supplanted the indigenous ways of running community affairs. This time the head of the community was the gobernadorcillo, which bore the title capitan. This position is equivalent to the present day Municipal Mayor.

Mamerto Manuel Valmores was appointed in 1820 as the first gobernadorcillo of the town. The last gobernadorcillo was Leon Valmores. Holding this position for about 16 years (1822-1837), Francisco Anuario Valmores, the eldest son of Mamerto Manuel, may be considered as the longest serving gobernadorcillo.

New leaders had surfaced as changes in the Philippine government took place. Faustino Vega became the first town executive, which has known that time as presidente local, under the short-lived First Philippine Republic (1898-1903). Melquiades Vega, the son of Faustino Vega, served as the first presidente local under the American Regime (1903-1928).

Ramon Neri Ludeña became the first mayor under the Commonwealth Government while Jose P. Roa served the same position during World War II (1938-1944). The first municipal mayor under the Republic of the Philippines was Gorgonio B. Tagarda.

The more recent elected town mayors included Manuel Varquez; Alejo E. Olano, Sr; Porferio R. Roa; Andrea H. Borromeo, Felix H. Borromeo and lawyer Alexis Quina, who is known for civil development. Marietta R. Abogado, daughter of former municipal mayor Porferio Roa assumed the town's top post last June 30, 2016.

Geography

Climate

Barangays
Balingasag is politically subdivided into 30 barangays.

Demographics

Economy

List of Cultural Properties of Balingasag

|}

Tourism

 Vega Ancestral House - located in the Poblacion district, is a preserved Philippine colonial house which has been visited by national leaders like General Emilio Aguinaldo and President Sergio Osmeña, and Gura - Vergara house that was established 1878. It was where then Inday Badiday, former showbiz anchor, lived as she was from Balingasag.
St. Rita's College of Balingasag - founded in 1901, the first Catholic School in Balingasag and is also among the top schools in the province.

References

External links

 [ Philippine Standard Geographic Code]
Philippine Census Information
Local Governance Performance Management System

Municipalities of Misamis Oriental